There are 3,854 hybrid buses, 785 battery electric buses, and 22 hydrogen fuel cell buses operating in London, as of March 2022, out of a total bus fleet of 8,795 - this is around 53% of the bus fleet.  

The battery electric fleet of the city (about 9% of the total fleet) is the second-largest in Europe, after Moscow, which has over 1000 electric buses operating. From 2021, all new buses will be zero emission, and the entire bus fleet will be zero emission by 2034, although Transport for London have stated that with additional funding, this could be achieved by 2030.

In 2021, it was announced that all buses in the fleet meet or exceed Euro VI emission standards, following the phasing out of older buses, the retrofitting of diesel vehicles and the introduction of new hybrid & electric buses.

Background
In 2006, transport was responsible for around 20% of London's CO2 emissions; with buses making up 5% of the transport total. The city set a target of a 20% reduction in emissions by the year 2020. Converting London's entire bus fleet to hybrid vehicles would reduce CO2 emissions by around 200,000 tonnes per year. Diesel buses also produce particulate pollution, which is harmful to health. By using less diesel fuel, operators can also reduce the running cost of their bus fleet.

Hybrid electric buses use a combination of an electric battery pack and a diesel engine to provide power, and produce around 40% less carbon dioxide (CO2) emissions than traditional diesel engined buses. Energy generated during braking is used to charge the batteries of hybrid vehicles. Battery electric buses use on-board batteries to power an electric motor that drives the bus. Unlike a hybrid electric bus, there are no local emissions. As with hybrid buses, regenerative braking is used to charge the batteries. Hydrogen fuel cell buses use the reaction of hydrogen with oxygen to generate electricity that drives the bus with an electric motor. The only emission from the bus is water.

Operational history
In the 1990s, early efforts to improve emissions involved replacing older diesel buses such as the AEC Routemaster, use of Ultra-low-sulfur diesel, and fitting particulate filters to exhausts. In 2000, three DAF SB220 East Lancs Myllennium buses powered by liquefied petroleum gas were used to transport visitors to the Millennium Dome. By December 2005, all buses met Euro II emission standards, with the first Euro IV bus entering service in April 2006.

Early trials and tests 

In January 2004, three hydrogen fuel cell powered buses were introduced on route 25 on a two-year trial. These were transferred to route RV1 in September 2004, and were tested in commercial service on the route at peak times only. They were withdrawn in January 2007. 

The first hybrid buses to enter service in London were six Wright Electrocity single-deckers. These were ordered in March 2005 to operate on route 360. The single decker buses were unveiled by Mayor of London, Ken Livingstone on 7 February 2006, with the intention of starting operation on the following day. Later in 2006 the vehicles were temporarily withdrawn from service when their diesel engines overheated.

A double-deck hybrid vehicle intended for use in London was unveiled in October 2006. The bus, which cost £285,000 and was constructed by Wrightbus, was the first hybrid double-decker in the world, and was painted in red and green to symbolise the environmental benefits. It entered service in February 2007 on route 141.

An ethanol fuelled double-decker bus was operated by Transdev London in 2008 and 2009. In 2010, eight hydrogen buses were introduced on route RV1, with a substantially larger range than the fuel cell buses used in the mid 2000s. At the time, this was the largest hydrogen bus fleet in Europe.

Introduction of hybrids 
Twenty-five vehicles entered service in December 2008, introduced onto five routes run by four different operators. A further eighteen entered service in July 2009, when six Volvo B5L double-deckers joined the existing vehicles on route 141.

Transport for London stated that it intended to have introduced around 300 hybrids into service by 2012. This was achieved in July 2012, when an Alexander Dennis Enviro400 double-decker of Abellio London became the 300th hybrid in use when it entered service on route 211. It was originally intended that every bus introduced into service after 2012 would be a hybrid, but this requirement was later dropped.

A trial of inductive charging technology for three modified Alexander Dennis Enviro400H double-deckers was announced in August 2014. The vehicles, on route 69, receive current to charge the traction batteries while at stands at either end of the route. Although it is intended that the units are to operate in "pure electric" mode, a standard diesel engine is also carried.

Retrofitting diesel buses 
In the 2010s, bus operators retrofitted older buses to improve fuel economy, reduce air pollution and meet emission standards. A three-year £86m project to improve 5,000 buses to Euro VI emission standards was completed in 2021.

A Kinetic energy recovery system using a carbon fibre flywheel, originally developed for the Williams Formula One racing team, has been modified for retrofitting to existing double-decker buses. 500 buses from the Go-Ahead Group will be fitted with this technology from 2014 to 2016, anticipated to improve fuel efficiency by approximately 20%. The team who developed the technology were awarded the Dewar Trophy of the Royal Automobile Club in 2015.

New Routemaster Programme
The New Routemaster double-decker was specified and constructed to a hybrid design. The bus was designed to be 40% more fuel-efficient than conventional diesel buses, and 15% more than London hybrid buses already in operation, reducing nitrogen oxide emissions by 40% and particulate matter by 33% compared with diesel buses. The first eight vehicles entered service with Arriva London on route 38 in February 2012. By 2018, a total of 1,000 New Routemasters were in service. However, the buses have suffered from problems with their battery systems with some operating solely as diesel vehicles, and in total 200 buses will have power units replaced under warranty.

Introduction of battery electric buses 
In December 2013, the first battery electric buses entered service in London as a trial on routes 521 and 507, using BYD Auto buses built in China. BYD estimated that the cost savings could be up to 75%, owing to the cost of electricity compared to diesel fuel. The trial was successful, and further orders for battery electric buses followed.

In 2015, the world's first battery electric double-decker bus entered service on route 98. The first routes in London solely served by battery electric single decker buses were routes 521 and 507 in 2016. The first route in London solely served by electric double-decker buses was route 43 in 2019.

In 2021, it was announced that all buses in the fleet meet or exceed Euro VI emission standards, following the phasing out of older buses, the retrofitting of diesel vehicles and the introduction of new hybrid & electric buses. By March 2022, over 700 electric buses were in service. In October 2022, rapid charging using a pantograph was introduced for battery electric buses on route 132, the first use of this technology in London. This allows batteries to be 'topped up' during the day.

Introduction of hydrogen fuel cell buses 

In June 2021, the world's first hydrogen fuel cell double-decker buses - the Wright StreetDeck Hydroliner - entered service on route 7.

Future plans 
The number of zero emission buses is due to increase to 2,000 by 2025. The entire fleet will be zero emission by 2034, although Transport for London have stated that with additional funding, this could be achieved by 2030.

All future bus routes that will use the Silvertown Tunnel - a new crossing of the River Thames in East London - will be zero emission when the tunnel opens in 2025.

Summary of current operations
There are 3,854 hybrid buses, 785 electric buses, and 22 hydrogen fuel cell buses operating in London, as of March 2022, out of a total bus fleet of 8,795. All buses meet Euro VI emission standards, or are zero emission.

A variety of hybrid vehicles are currently used. These include Alexander Dennis Enviro200H, Wright Electrocity, Optare Tempo and BYD electric bus single-deckers and Volvo B5LH, Wright Gemini 2, Alexander Dennis Enviro400H, and New Routemaster double-deckers.

Battery electric and hydrogen fuel cell vehicles currently used include Alexander Dennis Enviro200 EV and Optare MetroCity EV single-deckers and Wright StreetDeck, Optare MetroDecker EV and Alexander Dennis Enviro400 EV City.

Response 
The introduction of low emission vehicles in London has received praise from the Low Carbon Vehicle Partnership (LowCVP), which awarded Transport for London the first ever Low Carbon Champion Award for Buses in July 2010, and an joint award with Wrightbus for the development of the New Routemaster in 2013. On the 10th anniversary of LowCVP in 2013, TfL was awarded an Outstanding Achievement award for their work over the previous ten years - including the congestion charge, low emission zone as well as introduction of hybrid and hydrogen buses.

See also 
 Electric buses in Moscow
 Electric buses in China

References

Bus transport in London
Hybrid electric buses